Johan Edfors (born 10 October 1975) is a Swedish professional golfer who plays primarily on the European Tour.

Early life and amateur career
Edfors was born in Varberg. He attended the University of Texas at San Antonio on a Division I athletic scholarship for men's golf. He played for the team under the coaching of Barry Denton for two years.

Professional career
Edfors turned professional in 1997. He spent several years playing the second tier Challenge Tour, but failed to make the top hundred on the Order of Merit until 2003, when he won twice and topped the Challenge Tour Order of Merit. He narrowly failed to hold on to his tour card in 2004, but at the end of 2005 he regained it at the Final Qualifying School.

In 2006, Edfors achieved a maiden European Tour win at the TCL Classic and quickly followed up by winning the more prestigious Quinn Direct British Masters and the Scottish Open. His three victories took him into the top 50 of the Official World Golf Rankings in July 2006, and he finished the year placed 10th on the European Order of Merit.

Edfors had to wait almost three years for his next victory, which he achieved at the inaugural Black Mountain Masters in Thailand on the Asian Tour.

Edfors is known for being a big hitter averaging over 300 yards.

Professional wins (10)

European Tour wins (3)

1Co-sanctioned by the Asian Tour

Asian Tour wins (2)

1Co-sanctioned by the European Tour

Sunshine Tour wins (1)

*Note: The 2003 Stanbic Zambia Open was shortened to 54 holes due to weather.
1Co-sanctioned by the Challenge Tour

Challenge Tour wins (4)

*Note: Tournament shortened to 54 holes due to weather.
1Co-sanctioned by the Sunshine Tour

Challenge Tour playoff record (0–1)

Nordic Golf League wins (1)

Swedish Golf Tour wins (1)

Results in major championships

CUT = missed the half-way cut
"T" = tied

Results in World Golf Championships

QF, R16, R32, R64 = Round in which player lost in match play
"T" = Tied

Team appearances
Amateur
Jacques Léglise Trophy (representing the Continent of Europe): 1993

Professional
Royal Trophy (representing Europe): 2007 (winners), 2009, 2011 (winners)
European Championships (representing Sweden): 2018

See also
2005 European Tour Qualifying School graduates

References

External links

Swedish male golfers
UTSA Roadrunners men's golfers
European Tour golfers
Swedish expatriate sportspeople in the United Arab Emirates
Sportspeople from Halland County
People from Varberg
1975 births
Living people